A quadrat, in ecology and geography, is a frame used to isolate an area for study.

Quadrat may also refer to:

 Quadrat (hieroglyph block), a virtual rectangle or square in Egyptian hieroglyphic text
 Quadrat (patience), a solitaire card game
 Quad (typography), originally quadrat, a metal spacer used in letterpress typesetting

See also
Quadrate (disambiguation)
Quadratic (disambiguation)